Ahmed Sefrioui (January 1, 1915 - February 25, 2004) was a Moroccan novelist and pioneer of Moroccan literature in the French language.

Biography 
He was born in Fes in 1915 of Berber parents. Sefrioui was founder of the Dar Batḥa Museum in Fes, a town that is present in almost all of his writings. After the Qur'an school and the schools of Fes Sefrioui has made French his own. As a young journalist for "Action du Peuple" and as writer of historical articles as a curator for the  "Addoha" museum he mastered the language. After 1938 he worked at the government departments of culture, education and tourism in Rabat. He died in 2004.

References

Books
 Le chapelet d'ambre (Le Seuil, 1949) : His first novel centered on Fez (for this novel he receives "le grand prix littéraire du Maroc")
 La Boîte à merveilles (Le Seuil, 1954) : the city of Fez, as seen through the eyes of the little Mohammed. This novel about traditions and life in the city was a milestone for Moroccan literature.
 La maison de servitude (SNED, Algérie, 1973)
 Le jardin des sortilèges ou le parfum des légendes (L'Harmattan, 1989).

Berber writers
Moroccan novelists
Moroccan male writers
Male novelists
Moroccan autobiographers
1915 births
2004 deaths
20th-century novelists